The 2021 Eastern Michigan Eagles football team represented Eastern Michigan University during the 2021 NCAA Division I FBS football season. The Eagles were led by eighth-year head coach Chris Creighton and played their home games at Rynearson Stadium in Ypsilanti, Michigan. They competed as members of the West Division of the Mid-American Conference (MAC). For the third time in the past six seasons (2016, 2018), the Eagles clinched a winning record, becoming the sixth Eagle team to reach seven wins.

Schedule

References

Eastern Michigan
Eastern Michigan Eagles football seasons
Eastern Michigan Eagles football